Kanjigan (also Romanized as Kanjīgān) is a village in Sardasht Rural District, Zeydun District, Behbahan County, Khuzestan Province, Iran. At the 2006 census, its population was 98, in 16 families.

References 

Populated places in Behbahan County